"The Six Swans" (German: Die sechs Schwäne) is a German fairy tale collected by the Brothers Grimm in Grimm's Fairy Tales in 1812 (KHM 49). It is of Aarne–Thompson type 451 ("The Maiden Who Seeks Her Brothers"), commonly found throughout Europe. Other tales of this type include The Seven Ravens, The Twelve Wild Ducks, Udea and her Seven Brothers, The Wild Swans, and The Twelve Brothers. Andrew Lang included a variant of the tale in The Yellow Fairy Book.

Scholars and folktale catalogues report variants of the tale type across Europe, the Middle East, and even India and Japan, although the number of brothers and their animal form may vary between tales.

Origin 
The tale was published by the Brothers Grimm in the first edition of Kinder- und Hausmärchen in 1812, and substantially rewritten for the second edition in 1819. Their source is Wilhelm Grimm's friend and later wife Henriette Dorothea (Dortchen) Wild (1795–1867).

Synopsis

A King gets lost in a forest, and an old witch helps him, on the condition that he marry her beautiful daughter. The King suspects the mysterious maiden to be wicked, but agrees to marry her. He has six sons and a daughter from his first marriage, however, and fears that the children will be abused by his new wife; so, he sends them away to a hidden castle and visits them in secret.

The new queen, who has learned witchcraft from her mother, finds out about her stepchildren and decides to get rid of them. She sews six magical white shirts, goes to the hidden castle, and tosses the shirts over the boys, transforming them into swans.

The princes' still human sister runs away, finding her brothers in a hunter's hut. The princes can only take their human forms for fifteen minutes every evening. They tell their sister that they have heard of a way to lift the curse: for six years, she mustn't speak while making six shirts out of star-flowers for her brothers. On the other hand, if she speaks before the end of the sixth year, the spell will never be broken. The Princess agrees to do this and, taking shelter in a tree, dedicates herself solely to gathering the star-flowers and sewing in silence.

At the beginning of the fourth year, the King of another country finds the Princess sewing, is taken by her beauty, and takes her into the court with the intention of making her his queen. However, the King's snobbish mother hates her and does not consider her fit to be a queen. When she gives birth to their first child, the wicked mother-in-law takes away the infant and accuses the Queen of killing and eating him, but the King refuses to believe it.

The young Queen gives birth to two other children, but twice again the mother-in-law hides them away and falsely claims that she has killed and eaten her babies. The King is unable to keep protecting her, and unable to properly defend herself, the Queen is sentenced to be burned at the stake as a witch. All this time, she has held back her tears and her words, and sewing the star-flower shirts no matter what.

On the day of her execution, the Queen has finished making all the shirts for her brothers. When she is brought to the stake, she takes the shirts with her and when she is about to be burned, the six years expire and the six swans come flying through the air. She throws the shirts over her brothers and they regain their human form, although the youngest brother's left arm remains a wing due to his own shirt missing a sleeve (in some variants, the sister is unable to finish the last shirt in time, leaving her youngest brother a swan permanently).

The Queen is now free to speak and, with her brothers' support, defends herself against the accusations against her. The Queen's three missing children are found alive and her evil mother-in-law is the one who is burned at the stake as punishment. In the end, the Queen, her husband, three children, and six brothers live happily ever after.

Analysis
Folklorist Stith Thompson points that the stories of the Aarne–Thompson–Uther ATU 451 tale-type follow a long literary history, beginning with the tale of the Dolopathos, in the 12th century. The Dolopathos, in medieval tradition, was later used as part of the Knight of the Swan heroic tale.

Fairy tale scholar Jack Zipes cites that the Brothers Grimm considered an origin in Greco-Roman times, with parallels also found in French and Nordic oral traditions.

The Brothers Grimm themselves, on their annotations, saw a connection of "The Six Swans" tale with a story of seven swans published in the Feenmärchen (1801) and the swan-ride of the Knight of Swan (Lohengrin). They also saw a connection with the swan shirts of the swan maidens of the Volundarkvida.

On his notes on Children of Lir tale, in his book More Celtic Fairy Tales, folklorist Joseph Jacobs wrote that the "well-known Continental folk-tale" of The Seven Swans (or Ravens) became connected to the medieval cycle of the Knight of the Swan.

Variants

Distribution
The tale type is said to be "widely recorded" in Europe and in the Middle East, as well as in India and in the Americas. In Europe only, there exist "over two hundred versions" collected and published "in folktale collections from all parts" of the continent.

French scholar Nicole Belmont identified two forms of the tale type in Europe: one "essentially" present in the Germanic area and Scandinavia, and another she dubbed "western version". She noted that in this western version, the youngest sister, after she settles with the brothers, asks for fire from a neighbouring ogre, and a tree sprouts on their yard and bears fruit that causes the transformation.

Variants have also been collected in Japan with the name 七羽の白鳥 (Romanization: Nanaha no hakuchō; English: "The Seven Swans"). However, Japanese scholarship acknowledges that these tales are restricted to Kikaijima and Okinoerabujima. Japanese folklorist Keigo Seki also found variants in Kagoshima.

Literary predecessors
A literary predecessor to the tale is The Seven Doves (Neapolitan: Li sette palommelle; Italian: I sette colombi), in Giambattista Basile's Pentamerone, where the brothers are transformed into doves.

Number of brothers
In the tale from the Brothers Grimm, there are six brothers and they are transformed into swans.

In other European variants, the number of princes/brothers alternates between three, seven or twelve, but very rarely there are two, eight, nine, ten or even eleven, such as the Danish fairy tale collected by Mathias Winther, De elleve Svaner (English: "The Eleven Swans"), first published in 1823, or Ligurian tale Les onze cygnes.

Hungarian folk tale collector Elisabeth Sklarek compiled two Hungarian variants, Die sieben Wildgänse ("The Seven Wild Geese") and Die zehn Geschwister ("The Ten Siblings"), and, in her commentaries, noted that both tales were related to the Grimm versions. A third Hungarian is titled A tizenkét fekete  várju ("The Twelve Black Ravens").

Ludwig Bechstein collected two German variants, The Seven Crows and The Seven Swans.

Commenting on the Irish variant collected by Patrick Kennedy, Louis Brueyre indicated as another variant the Indian tale of Truth's Triumph, or Der Sieg der Wahrheit: in the second part of the tale, the youngest child, a girl, witnesses the transformation of her one hundred brothers into crows.

In a Lithuanian variant, Von den zwölf Brüdern, die als Raben verwandelt wurden or The Twelve Brothers, Twelve Black Ravens, the witch stepmother asks for her husband to kill his sons, burn their bodies and deliver her the ashes.

In the Hungarian variant A tizenkét koronás hattyu és a csiháninget fonó testvérkéjük, the boys' poor mother curses her twelve sons into the avian form, while also giving an escape clause: after their sister is born, she should sew twelve shirts to save them.

In a Sudanese tale, The ten white doves, the titular white doves are ten brothers transformed by their stepmother. Their sister has a dream where an old woman tells her the key to reversing the curse: weaving coats with leaves from the acacia tree she is placed on by her brothers after fleeing home.

Results of transformation
The other variation is in the result of the brothers' transformation: in some versions they are ducks, in others ravens, and even eagles, geese, peacocks, blackbirds, storks, cranes, jackdaws or rooks.

The eagle transformation is attested in the Polish tale Von der zwölf Prinzen, die in Adler verwandelt wurden (English: "The Twelve Princes who became Eagles"), translated as The Eagles. A similar transformation is attested in a Romanian tale, which was also compared to the Grimm's tale.

The geese transformation is present in the Irish variant The Twelve Wild Geese, collected by Irish folklorist Patrick Kennedy and compared to the German variants ("The Twelve Brothers" and "The Seven Ravens") and the Norse one ("The Twelve Wild Ducks").

In a tale attributed to Northern European origin, The Twelve White Peacocks, the twelve princelings are transformed into peacocks due to a curse cast by a troll.

The blackbird transformation is attested in a Central European tale (The Blackbird), collected by Theodor Vernaleken: the twelve brothers kill a blackbird and bury it in the garden, and from its grave springs an apple-tree bearing the fruit the causes the transformation.

The avian transformation of storks is present in a Polish tale collected in Kraków by Oskar Kolberg, O siedmiu braciach bocianach ("The Seven Stork Brothers").

The Hungarian tale A hét daru ("The Seven Cranes") attests the transformation of the brothers into cranes.

The jackdaw transformation is attested in the Hungarian tale, A csóka lányok ("The Jackdaw Girls"), wherein a poor mother wishes her rambunctious twelve daughters would turn into jackdaws and fly away, which was promptly fulfilled; and in the "West Prussian" tale Die sieben Dohlen ("The Seven Jackdaws"), collected by professor Alfred Cammann (de).

The transformation into rooks (a type of bird) is attested in Ukrainian tale "Про сімох братів гайворонів і їх сестру" ("The Seven Rook Brothers and Their Sister"): the mother curses their sons into rooks (also called "грак" and "грайворон" in Ukrainian). A sister is born years later and seeks her brothers. The tale continues with the motif of the poisoned apple and glass coffin of Snow White (ATU 709) and concludes as tale type ATU 706, "The Maiden Without Hands".

Folklorists Johannes Bolte and Jiri Polivka, in their commentaries to the Grimm fairy tales, compiled several variants where the brothers are transformed into all sorts of beasts and terrestrial animals, such as deer, wolves, and sheep. Likewise, Georgian professor Elene Gogiashvili stated that in Georgian variants of the tale type the brothers (usually nine) change into deer, while in Armenian variants, they number seven and become rams.

Cultural legacy
 Daughter of the Forest, the first book of the Sevenwaters trilogy by Juliet Marillier, is a detailed retelling of this story in a medieval Celtic setting. A young woman named Sorcha must sew six shirts from a painful nettle plant in order to save her brothers (Liam, Diarmuid, Cormack, Connor, Finbar and Padriac) from the witch Lady Oonagh's enchantment, remaining completely mute until the task is finished. Falling in love with a British lord, Hugh of Harrowfield alias "Red", complicates her mission.

 The Wild Swans (Sekai Meisaku Dōwa: Hakuchō no Ōji), a 1977 anime film by Toei Animation starring Eiko Masuyama as Princess Eliza that combines elements of The Six Swans and The Wild Swans by Hans Christian Andersen.

 An episode from the anime series Grimm's Fairy Tale Classics (Grimm Masterpiece Theater), starring Mitsuko Horie as the Princess (here named Elise), Toshiko Fujita as the witch, Hideyuki Hori as the prince, Ishizuka Unsho as the king, and Koichi Yamadera, Taku Takemura, Masami Kikuchi, and Keiichi Naniwa as the brothers. This plot differs in some parts from the Grimm's version, especially in the second part of the story. In the anime, the evil stepmother-queen kills her husband and puts a spell on his children to gain total control of the kingdom like in the original, but later she takes up the role of the Princess/Queen's evil mother-in-law and leaves Elise's baby son (her only child) in the forest. The swan-brothers find their nephew the forest and keep him alive, and they are stuck in their swan forms all day/night long (though they still can speak) until their sister breaks the curse and they give her the baby back. Elise finishes the garments in time, therefore the youngest is not left with a swan wing in the end. When the wicked stepmother is exposed as the witch and as the one who framed Elise at the end, she uses her magic in an attempt to escape but then accidentally catches fire from Elise's pyre and burns to death.

 Paul Weiland's episode "The Three Ravens" of Jim Henson's television series The Storyteller is another retelling of this classic tale. After the queen dies, an evil witch ensnares the king and turn his three sons into ravens. The princess escapes and must stay silent for three years, three months, three weeks and three days to break the spell. But after she meets a handsome prince, this is suddenly not so easy, for her stepmother has killed her father and remarried - to the prince's father. But when the witch attempts to burn the princess at the stake, the ravens attack her and she accidentally sets fire to herself instead, instantly turning into ashes. Her death almost fully reverses the spell, but the princess breaks her silence three minutes too soon, and her youngest brother subsequently keeps one wing forever.

 The novel Birdwing by Rafe Martin follows the youngest prince, human but with a wing instead of his left arm, as he grows up with this "deformity."

 Moonlight, Ann Hunter and set on the Summer Isle, an alternate Ireland, features a thirteen-year-old princess named Aowyn who loses her mother to a mysterious illness, and is charged with protecting her father and her six brothers from the conniving of a witch bent on taking the throne.

 The Unfinished World by Amber Sparks adapts this story into "La Belle de Nuit, La Belle de Jour", a mixed modern-day retelling with fairytale elements such as kingdoms and cars, televisions and golems, and witches and politicians. Here, the princess is cursed so that her words turn to bees, preventing her from speaking.

 Irish novelist Padraic Colum used a similar tale in his novel The King of Ireland's Son, in the chapter The Unique Tale: the queen wishes for a blue-eyed, blonde-haired daughter, and carelessly wishes her sons to "go with the wild geese". As soon as the daughter is born, the princes change into gray wild geese and fly away from the castle.

See also

 Knight of the Swan
 Children of Lir

References

Further reading
 Liszka József. "A bátyjait kereső leány (ATU 451) meséjének közép-európai összefüggéseihez" [Notes on the Central European Correlations of the Folktale Maiden Who Seeks Her Brothers (ATU 451)]. In: Fórum Társadalomtudományi Szemle 18. évf. 3. sz. / 2016. pp. 21–34. (In Hungarian)
 Cholnoky Olga. "Liszka József: Egy mesemotívum vándorútja" [The Journey of a Tale Theme]. In: Kisebbségkutatás. 26/2017, nº. 2. pp. 150–153. [overview of the diffusion of the ATU 451 tale-type in Central Europe] (In Hungarian)
 Danišová, Nikola. "Morfológia motívu figurálnej transformácie v príbehovej látke o sestre, ktorá hľadá svojich bratov zakliatych na zvieratá" [Morphology of the Motif of Figural Transformation in the Subject of Stories about a Sister Seeking Her Brothers Turned into Animals]. In: Slovenská Literatúra 2, 67/2020, pp. 157-169. (In Slovak).
 de Blécourt, Willem. "Metamorphosing Men and Transmogrified Texts", In: Fabula 52, no. 3-4 (2012): 280-296. https://doi.org/10.1515/fabula-2011-0023
 Domokos, Mariann. "A bátyjait kereső lány-típus (ATU 451) a 19. századi populáris olvasmányokban és a szóbeliségben" [The emergence of The Maiden Who Seeks Her Brothers tale type (ATU 451) in 19th-century Hungarian popular readings and orality]. In: ETHNO-LORE: A MAGYAR TUDOMÁNYOS AKADÉMIA NÉPRAJZI KUTATÓINTÉZETÉNEK ÉVKÖNYVE XXXVI (2019): pp. 303–333.

External links

 

Grimms' Fairy Tales
German fairy tales
Fictional princes
Fictional swans
Fiction about shapeshifting
Textiles in folklore
Witchcraft in fairy tales
Male characters in fairy tales
ATU 400-459